The 1981 Campeonato Nacional was Chilean league top tier's 49th season. Colo-Colo was the tournament's champion, winning its thirteenth title.

League table

Results

Topscorers

Liguilla Pre-Copa Libertadores

Promotion/relegation Liguilla

See also 
 1981 Copa Polla Gol

References

External links 
ANFP 
RSSSF Chile 1981

Primera División de Chile seasons
Chile
Prim